Al-Gosaibi, Al Gosaibi or Algosaibi is a Peninsular Arabic surname.
Notable people with this family name include:
 Ghazi Abdul Rahman Al Gosaibi (1940–2010), Saudi Arabian politician, diplomat and technocrat
 Saud Abdul Aziz Al Gosaibi (1963–2003), Saudi Arabian businessman and managing director of Ahmad Hamad Al Gosaibi & Brothers 
 Sulaiman Hamad Al Gosaibi (died 2009), Saudi Arabian businessman

Arabic-language surnames